Bernard Hill Fawcett (28 April 1909 – 28 December 1961) was a British ice hockey player. He competed in the men's tournament at the 1928 Winter Olympics.

References

1909 births
1961 deaths
English ice hockey players
Ice hockey players at the 1928 Winter Olympics
Olympic ice hockey players of Great Britain
People from Lewisham
Sportspeople from London